The 1884 Michigan gubernatorial election was a state election held on November 4, 1884. Republican nominee Russell A. Alger defeated incumbent Josiah W. Begole, who ran on a fusion ticket, representing both the Democratic and Greenback, with 47.67% of the vote.

General election

Candidates
Major party candidates
Russell A. Alger, Republican
Josiah W. Begole, Democratic, Greenback
Other candidates
David Preston, Prohibition
Jesse M. Mille, Greenback

Results

References

1884
Michigan
Gubernatorial
November 1884 events